A vehicle is a mechanical means of conveyance, such as a carriage or automobile. It may also refer to:

Vahana, the Hindu term for a vehicle animal closely associated with a particular deity
Star vehicle, a production primarily aimed at enhancing an actor's career
Vehicle (The Ides of March album)
"Vehicle" (song), the title track by The Ides of March
Vehicle (The Clean album)
Braitenberg vehicles, simple machines conceived by Valentino Braitenberg for a thought experiment in artificial intelligence
Vehicle (paint), the substance in which the coloring pigment is suspended
Vehicle (pharmaceutics), a carrier of a medicinally active substance 
In law, a legal personality such as a corporation, with similar legal rights to a living person

See also
Vessel (disambiguation)